Naguib ( Najib) is a given and family name in Egyptian Arabic, a variant of the Arabic name Najib. It may refer to the following people:
Antonios Naguib, Egyptian Catholic patriarch
David Naguib Pellow, American ethnologist
Mohamed Naguib, first president of Egypt
Mohamed Naguib Hamed, Egyptian athlete
Naguib el-Rihani, Egyptian actor
Naguib Kanawati, Egyptian-Australian Egyptologist
Naguib Mahfouz, Egyptian novelist
Naguib Pasha Mahfouz, Egyptian doctor
Naguib Sawiris, Egyptian businessman
Zaki Naguib Mahmoud, Egyptian philosopher

Arabic-language surnames
Arabic masculine given names
Surnames